Netechma brunneochra is a species of moth of the family Tortricidae. It is endemic to Ecuador (Morona-Santiago Province) and Peru.

The ground colour of the forewings is cream white dotted with dark brown, especially along the wing edges. The hindwings are cream, slightly mixed with pale ochreous in the apical third.

Etymology
The species name refers to the forewing markings and is derived from Latin brunneus (meaning brown) and Greek chra (meaning touched).

References

Moths described in 2006
Moths of South America
brunneochra